The Oxford Civic Society  is a civic society that was founded in 1969 to oppose plans to build inner relief roads in Oxford, England.

The Society comments on all aspects of urban planning and is a founder member of the Oxfordshire Blue Plaques Board. It organises an annual OxClean Spring Clean weekend that collects several tonnes of litter throughout Oxford and recycles as much of it as possible.

Oxford Civic Society is a registered charity under English law.

See also 
Oxford Preservation Trust

References

External links 
Oxford Civic Society website
Oxclean

Organizations established in 1969
Culture in Oxford
History of Oxford
Organisations based in Oxford
Transport in Oxford
Clubs and societies in Oxfordshire
1969 establishments in England
Charities based in Oxfordshire
Civic societies in the United Kingdom